Jean-Marie Odin, C.M., (February 25, 1800 – May 25, 1870) was a French-born prelate of the Roman Catholic Church.  He served as the second archbishop of the Archdiocese of New Orleans from 1861 to 1870.

Odin previously served as the first vicar apostolic of Texas from 1841 to 1847 and as the first bishop of the Diocese of Galveston in Texas from 1847 to 1861.  He has been called the father of the Catholic Church in Texas.

Biography

Early life 
The seventh of ten children, Jean-Marie Odin was born in Hauteville, an hamlet inside the city of Ambierle in the Department of Loire in France to Jean Odin and Claudine Marie (née Seyrol) Odin. After showing interest in Catholicism at age nine, Odin's parents sent him to study Latin under his uncle, the pastor of Noailly.  After his uncle die, he returned home to study on his own

Odin eventually attended schools in Roanne in Verrières, then began his studies in philosophy at L'Argentière and Alix.  He finally ended up at the Sulpician seminary in Lyon.

In 1822, while still in seminary, Odin was recruited by a representative of Bishop Louis Dubourg to do mission work for the Archdiocese of New Orleans.  That same year, Odin immigrated to the United States, After arriving in New Orleans, the archbishop sent him to Perryville, Missouri, to complete his formation as a priest at St. Mary's of the Barrens Seminary in Perryville, Missouri. Odin professed his vows for the Congregation of the Mission (also known as the Vincentians) on November 8, 1822

Priesthood 
Odin was ordained to the priesthood for the Vicentians by Bishop Dubourg on May 4, 1823. After his ordination, Dubourg performed missionary work in New Madrid, Missiouri, and with Native American tribes along the Arkansas River.  He also became a faculty member at  St. Mary's Seminary, later being named president. Odin accompanied Bishop Joseph Rosati  to the Second Provincial Council of Baltimore in 1833 as theologian.  He briefly served as pastor of St. Vincent de Paul Parish in Cape Girardeau, Missouri, opening a Catholic school there in 1838.

On October 24, 1839, Pope Gregory XVI erected the Apostolic Prefecture of Texas, to cover the territory of the newly independent Republic of Texas.  After Odin was assigned as vice-prefect apostolic under Reverend John Timon, he moved to Texas. Odin worked to bring Catholics back Catholics who had left the church during the Texas Revolution as well as to proselytize among Protestants and Native Americans. In December 1840, Gregory XVI appointed Odin as coadjutor bishop of what was then the Diocese of Detroit, but Odin declined the position.

Vicar Apostolic of Texas 
On July 16, 1841, Gregory XVI  appointed Odin as the first vicar apostolic of Texas and titular bishop of Claudiopolis in Isauria . He received his episcopal consecration on March 6, 1842, from Bishop Antoine Blanc, with Bishops Michael Portier and John J. Chanche serving as co-consecrators, at New Orleans.

With the assistance of the French chargé d'affaires, Alphonse Dubois de Saligny, Odin successfully negotiated the Texas government's confirmation of the church's title to fifteen acres in San Antonio. During his tenure, the Texan Congress returned several several churches that had been secularized by the Mexican Government.  He opened several  schools and invited the Ursuline nuns as the first religious community in Texas  to operate them. In December 1845, the Republic of Texas was accepted into the United States as the State of Texas.

Bishop of Galveston 
On May 21, 1847, Odin was named the first bishop of the newly erected Diocese of Galveston, which include all of Texas. He recruited the Brothers of Mary and Oblates of Mary to operate of St. Mary's University at Galveston, which he established in 1854. He also completed arduous visitations into the more remote parts of Texas, and twice visited Europe to secure priests and material help for the diocese. By the end of his tenure, he had increased the number of priests to 84 and the number of churches to 50; for his many efforts he has been called the father of the modern Catholic Church in Texas.

Archbishop of New Orleans 
Odin was appointed the second archbishop of New Orleans by Pope Pius IX on February 15, 1861. When Odin arrived in New Orleans, Louisiana had seceded from the United States and the American Civil War had started. Like many other Catholic clergy in the American South, Odin was a Confederate sympathizer. He was one of Pope Pius IX's contacts in his unsuccessful attempts to mediate a peace agreement to end to the war. Odin allowed priests from the diocese to serve as chaplains in the Confederate States Army and nuns from the diocese served in field hospitals across the southern states.

New Orleans was occupied by the Union Army in May 1862. Union Army troops used several church buildings for offices, hospitals and barracks.  With the finances of the archdiocese impacted by the war, Odin issued austerity measures in January 1863 that met with significant opposition.  That winter, he went to Rome to obtain papal approval for his financial plan.  While in Europe, he recruited 30 seminarians and five Ursulines nuns to move to New Orleans in early 1863. In April 1863, Odin returned to New Orleans.

Odin soon ran into conflict with Father Claude Paschal Maistre, a French priest who was a strong advocate of the abolition of slavery. Odin put Maistre's parish under an interdict in May 1863, accusing Maistre of "preaching the love of liberty and independence" to slaves and "exciting insurrection against their masters".  When Maistre officiated the funeral of André Cailloux, a mixed-race soldier in the Union Army who died heroically, Odin expressed his condemnation.  Odin discovered that Maistre had left France under a cloud of accusations of financial impropriety; he used this as a pretext to restrict Maistre.  Maistre was only accepted back in good standing to the priesthood after Odin's death.  

Odin incorporated the archdiocese in 1866 and closed the diocesan seminary in 1867 due to lack of funds. He founded the diocesan newspaper, The Morning Star in February 1868.  Odin went to Rome to attend the First Vatican Council in 1869, but left the city early due to health reasons.  Suffering from neuralgia and in overall poor health, Odin went home to Saint-Georges-Haute-Ville to convalesce.  He would never return to the United States

Death and legacy 
Jean-Marie Odie died in Ambierle (Department of Loire) on May 25, 1870, at age 70.

References

Further reading

 Foley, Patrick.  "Builder of the Faith in Nineteenth-Century Texas: A Deeper Look at Bishop Jean-Marie Odin," Catholic Southwest (2008) 19#1 pp 52–65.
 Foley, Patrick.  Missionary Bishop: Jean-Marie Odin in Galveston and New Orleans (Texas A&M University Press; 2013) 206 pages;
 Thiriet, Damien. Jean-Marie Odin, premier évêque du Texas, Association des amis de Monseigneur Jean-Marie Odin, 2022, 60 pages

1802 births
1847 deaths
People from Loire (department)
Vincentians
French expatriates in the United States
French Roman Catholic missionaries
American military chaplains
Vincentian bishops
19th-century Roman Catholic archbishops in the United States
Roman Catholic archbishops of New Orleans
Catholic Church in Texas
Foreign Confederate military personnel
Roman Catholic Ecclesiastical Province of Galveston–Houston
Roman Catholic missionaries in the United States
Roman Catholic bishops of Galveston–Houston